Epic! is an American kids subscription-based reading and learning platform. It offers access to books and videos for children ages 12 and under. The service can be used on desktop and mobile devices.
 
Epic! was founded in 2013 by Suren Markosian and Kevin Donahue  and launched in 2014. Indian educational technology company Byju's acquired Epic! in July 2021 in a cash and stock deal worth $500 million.

Content 
Books are available in read-to-me and audiobook formats and include both non-fiction and fiction titles, covering a subjects and themes such as: STEM, language arts, social science, history, music, art, science fiction and DIY.  Titles and series include  BIG NATE, Garfield, Warriors and The Chronicles of Narnia series. Books are available in English, Spanish, Chinese, and French and includes bilingual options. The Epic! app offers personalized recommendations based on a child's reading level and interest.  Users can search for books, videos and quizzes on Epic! based on age, keyword and reading levels.

Publishing network  
As of May 2017, Epic! had 250 publisher and video provider partners, including HarperCollins, Macmillan, Candlewick, National Geographic Kids, Smithsonian Enterprises and Encyclopædia Britannica. Epic! is a member of publishing industry trade groups, including: the Children's Book Council, the Independent Book Publishers Association, the Educational Book & Media Association and the Audio Publishers Association.

Recognition
 2016 Best App for Teaching and Learning; and The Best Website for Teaching and Learning (The American Association of School Librarians).

References

Subscription services
Virtual learning environments
American educational websites
Internet properties established in 2013
2013 establishments in California
Companies based in Redwood City, California
Children's entertainment
Byju's